In the Odyssey, Mentor (Greek: Μέντωρ, Méntōr; gen.: Μέντορος) was the son of Alcimus. In his old age Mentor was a friend of Odysseus. When Odysseus left for the Trojan War, he placed Mentor in charge of his son Telemachus, and of Odysseus' palace.

Athena's appearance as Mentor should not be confused with her appearance as Mentes in the first book of the Odyssey.

Mentor as term

Because of Mentor's relationship with Telemachus, and the disguised Athena's encouragement and practical plans for dealing with personal dilemmas, the personal name Mentor has been adopted in Latin and other languages, including English, as a term meaning someone who imparts wisdom to and shares knowledge with a less-experienced colleague.

The first recorded modern usage of the term can be traced to a 1699 book entitled Les Aventures de Télémaque by the French writer François Fénelon. In the book the lead character is that of Mentor. This book was very popular during the 18th century and the modern application of the term can be traced to this publication.

References

External links

Homer’s Mentor: Duties Fulfilled or Misconstrued—An on-line version of Andy Roberts' paper (see the References section)

Alternative education
Characters in the Odyssey
Jungian archetypes